Alsco (American Linen Supply Company) is an American company, it is a linen and uniform-rental business service provider to restaurants, health care organizations, the automotive industry and industrial facilities. Having around 180 locations, with 355,000 customers in 14 countries, Alsco ranked #380 in Forbes 2007 list of America's Largest Private Companies.

History 

During the 1890s economic slump that saw a sharp decline in corn prices which greatly affected Nebraska’s economy weather—drought, blizzards and early frosts—compounded the problems. As a result the Lincoln Towel and Apron Supply Company, along with most other businesses, began to struggle. As customers reduced their accounts, the young Steiner brothers found it difficult to continue. George decided to relocate to Salt Lake City and continue the business. 

In Salt Lake City, George’s business grew rapidly, and by 1899, it was large enough for George to rent his first plant, located on First South at the site of the old Morgan Hotel. This plant would allow George’s company, now called American Linen, to launder and process its own linens rather than contracting out the work to competitive laundries. From there, the company continued to grow. In 1910, American Linen added a new processing plant at 33 East and Six South, where the Grand America Hotel now stands. And in the early 1990s, it built its current local facility in West Valley City.

The present day company, a private family enterprise that has existed for over 130 years as of 2021, employs more than 20,000 people in multiple locations across countries worldwide. It is still managed, owned and operated by members, i.e. progeny of the original founder and owner’s family, Kevin and Robert Steiner.

Services 
Alsco provides linen- and uniform-rental services to customers that include restaurants, health care organizations, the automotive industry and industrial facilities.

References

External links 
Official website

Business services companies of the United States
American companies established in 1889
Business services companies established in 1889
Companies based in Salt Lake City
Privately held companies based in Utah
1889 establishments in Utah Territory
Companies established in 1889